Angèle Makombo-Eboum is a Congolese (Democratic Republic of the Congo) politician.

She graduated from University of Paris 1 Panthéon-Sorbonne, and Sciences Po, and worked at the United Nations.

Works

References

External links 
 Interview with Angèle Makombo, DRC Sep 14, 2018
 Angèle Makombo Radio Okapi 09/11/2020

Democratic Republic of the Congo politicians
Year of birth missing (living people)
Living people
21st-century Democratic Republic of the Congo people
Pantheon-Sorbonne University alumni
Sciences Po alumni
Democratic Republic of the Congo officials of the United Nations